Prionezhsky District is an administrative district (raion), one of the fifteen in the Republic of Karelia, Russia. It is located in the southeast of the republic. Its administrative center is the city of Petrozavodsk (which is not administratively a part of the district). As of the 2010 Census, the total population of the district was 21,502.

Administrative and municipal status
Within the framework of administrative divisions, Prionezhsky District is one of the fifteen in the Republic of Karelia and has administrative jurisdiction over all of its fifty-one rural localities. The city of Petrozavodsk serves as its administrative center, despite being incorporated separately as a city of republic significance—an administrative unit with the status equal to that of the districts.

As a municipal division, the district is incorporated as Prionezhsky Municipal District. Its fifty-one rural localities are incorporated into thirteen rural settlements within the municipal district. The city of republic significance of Petrozavodsk is incorporated separately from the district as Petrozavodsky Urban Okrug, but serves as the administrative center of the municipal district as well.

References

Notes

Sources

Districts of the Republic of Karelia
 
